Världens lyckligaste par is a song written and composed by Christer Ericsson, and originally recorded by Lasse Stefanz, featuring Olle Jönsson on lead vocals, as a duet with Lotta Engberg. The song lyrics depict a couple who has met and made each other happy, stayed together for year, and look bright upon the future.. The song was also released on a single in 1986.

The song charted at Svensktoppen for 17 weeks (including the summer break) between 17 May–22 November 1987, and also topped the chart.

The song intro has also acted as opening theme for radio program  Dansgolvet at Sveriges Radio P4 Jönköping.

References

1986 singles
Lotta Engberg songs
Swedish-language songs
Dansband songs
Male–female vocal duets